WWII is a duet album by Waylon Jennings and Willie Nelson, released on RCA Victor in 1982.

Background
By 1982, the outlaw country movement was past its peak but Jennings and Nelson, the movement's primary artists, remained two of country music's biggest superstars.  Jennings had scored nine Top 5 solo albums in a row, with five going to #1, between 1974 and 1982.  Nelson was also enjoying his commercial prime, with his 1982 album Always on My Mind not only topping the Billboard country albums chart but also peaking at #2 on the pop albums chart.  By the early 1980s, Nelson's appeal had transcended country music; his affable personae, as well as his increasing presence in films, had made him a crossover star.  Jennings, who was struggling to rebuild his finances and in the throes of a crippling cocaine addiction, had seen his most recent album Black on Black receive lukewarm reviews, even though it had been produced by Chips Moman, who had also produced Nelson's Always on My Mind.

Jennings and Nelson had enjoyed some of their greatest success together.  The 1976 compilation Wanted! The Outlaws became the first million selling country album and their 1978 album Waylon and Willie, released at the height of the outlaw country movement, produced the chart-topping hit "Mammas Don't Let Your Babies Grow Up to Be Cowboys."  By all accounts, Jennings and Nelson were kindred spirits and close friends, but their egos did clash occasionally; in his memoir Willie Nelson, biographer Joe Nick Patoski quotes Nelson's ex-wife Connie:  "They had such a mutual respect for each other and their music, it was like a brother bond, literally.  There was always a little bit of - not jealousy - but Willie would make him [Jennings] feel inferior in some ways, and I think it was because of the cocaine."  Asleep at the Wheel pianist Floyd Domino, who played with Jennings' band in 1983, also noticed the tension between the two legends, telling Patoski, "You could tell Waylon was bothered by Willie's success, although he said he didn't care.  He'd tell audiences, 'I don't care if I'm not number one.  I'll be number two.'  The crowd didn't even know what he was talking about.  I saw Willie on some cooking show on TV and the host said Waylon was mad at him.  Willie laughed and said, 'What's he mad about today?'  Waylon cared.  Willie didn't."

Recording
Although Chips Moman had produced both singers' previous albums, the sessions that comprise WWII date from before those records; most are from December 1981.  The songs were recorded at Moman's Nashville studio and mastered at Woodland Studios with David Cherry serving as co-engineer with Moman.  Whereas 1978's Waylon and Willie contained several previously released backing tracks upon which Nelson had overdubbed his vocals, WWII bears all the hallmarks of Moman's slick production.  Despite being more of a "complete thought" than its predecessor, the vitality evident on Waylon and Willie is not as apparent on this LP; in his review of the album that can be found on AllMusic, Stephen Thomas Erlewine observes:

"In 1982, Waylon and Willie were still riding high on the country charts, but the quality of Jennings' work was beginning to slip and his sales were responding accordingly, as 1982's Black on Black reflected. Nelson had his biggest hit ever that year with Always on My Mind, but it also was his worst album to date, the first time he sounded like he couldn't be bothered...even at its best, WWII is nowhere near as good as Waylon and Willie are at their best, since they're coasting on reputation through most of this, a fact that's only enhanced by Moman's glossy showcase production."

Although billed as a collaborative effort, WWII is more of a vehicle for Jennings; Willie sings on only five of the eleven tracks - all duets - while Waylon takes the lead on the remaining six songs.  The album spawned one hit, a cover of Otis Redding's "(Sittin' On) The Dock of the Bay," which peaked at #13 on the country singles charts.  Despite its modest success compared to some of the duo's previous singles like "Good Hearted Woman" and "Mammas Don't Let your Babies Grow Up to Be Cowboys," the song is brilliantly interpreted and remains as good an example as any of the fellow Texans' chemistry as artists.  Another highlight is "Write Your Own Songs," Nelson's diatribe of the music business and music executives in particular ("We're making you rich and you were already lazy/So lay on your asses and get richer or write your own songs"), whom he and Jennings had battled for years to gain control of their own records.  Jennings had a hand in writing two songs: the inspirational "Roman Candles," which he composed with Michael Smotherman, and the narration "The Old Mother's Locket Trick," written with fellow outlaw Guy Clark.  The Chips Moman/Bobby Emmons composition "May I Borrow Some Sugar from You" had appeared on Jennings' previous album Black on Black, while "The Last Cowboy Song" would resurface three years later on the first Highwaymen album.  Jennings and Nelson also cover the Tom T. Hall classic story song "The Year Clayton Delaney Died."

Reception
Ultimately, WWII failed to have as major an impact as Waylon & Willie, although it peaked at #3 on the Billboard country albums chart and #57 on the pop albums chart.

Track listing
"Mr. Shuck and Jive" (Jimmy Webb) (Art Garfunkel cover) – 3:49
Duet
"Roman Candles" (Jennings, Michael Smotherman) – 3:04
"(Sittin' on) the Dock of the Bay" (Steve Cropper, Otis Redding) (Otis Redding cover) – 3:22
Duet
"The Year That Clayton Delaney Died" (Tom T. Hall) (Tom T. Hall cover) – 3:06
Duet
"Lady in the Harbor" (Jerry Allison, Sonny Curtis, Doug Gilmore) – 3:18
"May I Borrow Some Sugar from You" (Bobby Emmons, Chips Moman) – 3:24
"The Last Cowboy Song" (Ed Bruce, Ron Peterson) (Ed Bruce cover) – 2:18
"Heroes" (Bobby Emmons, Chips Moman) – 2:46
Duet
"The Teddy Bear Song" (Don Earl, Nick Nixon) (Barbara Fairchild cover) – 3:11
"Write Your Own Songs" (Nelson) – 3:14
Duet
"The Old Mother's Locket Trick" (Guy Clark) (Harold Lee cover) – 3:10

Chart performance

Personnel
Waylon Jennings - guitar, vocals
J.I. Allison - drums
Gene Chrisman - drums, percussion
Chips Moman - guitar
Reggie Young - guitar
Willie Nelson - guitar, vocals
Bobby Emmons - keyboards
Johnny Christopher - guitar, backing vocals
Bobby Wood - piano
Toni White - backing vocals
Mike Leech - bass
Jerry Bridges - bass

References

Waylon Jennings albums
Willie Nelson albums
1982 albums
RCA Records albums
Albums produced by Chips Moman
Collaborative albums
Vocal duet albums